Partial general elections were held in Luxembourg on 3 June 1934, electing 29 of the 54 seats in the Chamber of Deputies in the south and east of the country. The Party of the Right won 12 of the 29 seats, but saw its total number of seats fall from 26 to 25.

The Communist Party of Luxembourg won its first seat, but it was later invalidated by a vote in the Chamber of Deputies. Its seat was given instead to the Luxembourg Workers' Party, who had voted against its expulsion.

Results

By constituency

References

Chamber of Deputies (Luxembourg) elections
Legislative election, 1934
Luxembourg
1934 in Luxembourg
June 1934 events
Election and referendum articles with incomplete results